Seema Simham is a 2002 Telugu-language action film produced by J. Bhagawan & D. V. V. Danayya under the Sri Balaji Art Creations banner and directed by G. Ram Prasad. It stars Nandamuri Balakrishna and Simran, while Reema Sen also appears in second female lead role and The music is composed by Mani Sharma. The film met with mixed reviews from critics.

Plot
The film begins with the two besties Dhanunjaya Rao & Chandra Sekhar. Dhanunjaya Rao a tycoon does beyond suffice to Chandra Sekhar showing eminence of friendship. The two of them are blessed with male children on the same day and lead jollity. After a while, Chandra Shekar being a police officer seizes a dreaded goon, whose men abduct Dhanunjaya Rao’s son as an exchange. During the swap, Chandra Shekar succumbs to his selfishness and shoots the criminal. As a result, Dhanunjaya Rao’s son dies which leads to the blackout stage of his wife Lakshmi. Frenzied, Dhanunjaya Rao is out for blood by slaying Chandra Shekar’s son whom he hides on. 

Years roll by, and Dhanunjaya Rao is still under hunt of the boy and Lakshmi is in a coma. Once, he sights a rectitude & rebel Durga Prasad thrashing the wicked cops for abusing the penniless woman. Currently, Dhanunjaya Rao assigns him the task to detect the whereabouts and assassinate the foe’s son which he accepts. Plus, Durga Prasad accommodates at his residence where he is acquainted with his naughty nephew Charulatha / Baby. After a series of donnybrooks, she crushes. Shortly, he develops an affinity with Dhanunjaya Rao and reduces his grief. Step by Step, he makes Lakshmi normal with his volition. At that juncture, a valiant Simbhu Prasad arrives as Chandra Shekar’s son who collisions Durga Prasad and is killed. Further, Dhanunjaya Rao’s couple embraces Durga Prasad as their son, settles nuptials and notifies his diabolic sister Chamundeswari. Here as a flabbergast, she infuriated repulses claiming Durga Prasad is a stout-hearted SP and spins rearward. 

Now the tale shifts to a village where MP Kaaleswara Rao husband of Chamundeswari suppresses them under his toe and conducts various atrocities. Hema a charming beauty halts therein, between the journey and is aware of the status quo. All at once, Durga Prasad alights and encounters Kaaleswara Rao’s son which Hema view and falls for him. Apart from this, Kulashekar Rao the father of Hema coheres to the grounds of caste advances with the proposal to Durga Prasad’s father Visweswara Rao. In the interim, Kaaleswara Rao incarcerates the village and gives a call to Durga Prasad jeopardizing them. However, he succeeds in shielding them by thundering on knaves, but tragically, his right arm is paralyzed. 

Despite this, Hema stands firm defying her parents, resides at Durga Prasad’s house, serves day & night, and recoups him. During their wedlock, Chamundeswari ruses break a cover-up that Durga Prasad is a foster to Visweswara Rao. So, Kulashekar Rao cancels the match when Durga Prasad aims and moves in quest of his parents. Presently, as a startle, Durga Prasad is the real son of Chandra Shekar and Simbhu Prasad is his younger progeny of Visweswara Rao. The two made this play for the serenity of Dhanunjaya Rao and to rectify Lakshmi. Being cognizant of it, Dhanunjaya Rao flares up with Kaaleswara Rao & Chamundeswari when Durga Prasad bows his head down for sacrifice. On the verge to slay, Lakshmi hinders him when he turns off. At last, Durga Prasad ceases the baddies and Dhanunjaya Rao forgives Chandra Sekhar. Finally, the movie ends on a happy note with the marriage of Durga Prasad & Hema.

Cast

 Nandamuri Bala Krishna as Durga Prasad IPS, and Simha Prasad, the real son of Chandra Shekhar
 Simran as Hema
 Reema Sen as Charulatha / Baby
 Sai Kumar as Simbhu Prasad
 K. Viswanath as Visweswara Rao
 P. Vasu as MP Kaaleswara Rao
 Raghuvaran as Dhanunjaya Rao
 Charan Raj as Chandra Sekhar
 Jaya Prakash Reddy as Kulashekar Rao
 Brahmanandam as Bhadrachalam (servant)
 Tanikella Bharani as Kanakaiyah
 Annapurna as Hema's mother
 Anandaraj as Police Inspector
 Rao Ramesh as Hema's brother
 Narra Venkateswara Rao as Chandra Sekhar's brother-in-law
 Ahuti Prasad as Raghupathi
 Dharmavarapu Subramanyam as Villager
 M. S. Narayana as Snake Man
 Giri Babu as Doctor
 Gundu Hanumantha Rao as Priest
 Chalapathi Rao as Chalapeswara Rao
 Ranganath as I. G.
 Mohan Raj as Kaaleswara Rao's brother
 G. V. Sudhakar Naidu as Kaaleswara Rao's henchman
 Sakshi Ranga Rao as School Master
 Sujatha as Lakshmi
 Vennira Aadai Nirmala as Paravathi
 Sangeeta as Bhavani
 L. B. Sriram
 Costume Krishna as Minister Subramanya Sharma
 Raghunatha Reddy as Doctor
 Satya Prakash as Kaaleswara Rao's son
 Ramaraju as Kaaleswara Rao's henchmen
 Gautham Raju as Driver
 Rajitha as Hema's aunty
 Siva Parvathi as Chamundeswari
 Delhi Rajeswari as Doctor
 Varsha
 Alapathi Lakshmi
 Pavala Shyamala
 Kalpana Rai
 Master Anand Vardhan

Soundtrack

The music composed by Mani Sharma.

References

External links 

2002 films
2000s Telugu-language films
Films scored by Mani Sharma
Indian action films
2000s masala films
2002 action films